Bahodir Pardaev (born 26 April 1987) is an Uzbek footballer who currently plays for Uzbekistan Super League club FC Bunyodkor as a forward, having previously played for Navbahor Namangan, Sogdiana Jizzakh, Bunyodkor, Buxoro, Pakhtakor Tashkent and Kokand 1912.

Career
At the end of the 2015 season, Pardaev decided to leave Pakhtakor Tashkent.

Career statistics

Club

References

1987 births
Living people
Uzbekistani footballers
Association football forwards
FC Bunyodkor players
Uzbekistani expatriate footballers
Expatriate footballers in South Korea
Uzbekistani expatriate sportspeople in South Korea
K League 2 players